Rewari Block (Rewari Panchayat samiti) of Rewari district consists of 94 Gram panchayats and 118 Villages and 123401 is its pincode number.

References

Notes 
1.excluding municipalities, cantonments and Municipal Corporations constituted by law

Community development blocks in Haryana